Timo Achenbach (born 3 September 1982) is a German former professional footballer who played as a left-sided defender and midfielder.

A youth exponent of Borussia Dortmund, he had loans spells at VfB Lübeck and 1. FC Köln before playing for SpVgg Greuther Fürth, Alemannia Aachen, and SV Sandhausen in the 2. Bundesliga. In 2015 he moved to lower league side KFC Uerdingen 05.

Internationally, he represented Germany playing for the U21 and B teams.

Career
Born in Witten, West Germany, Achenbach started his footballing career as a youth player for teams such as his home team, FSV Witten and other clubs. At the age of fourteen he was scouted by Borussia Dortmund, who signed him and for whom he played for the remainder of his youth career.

The 2002–03 season was a good one for the Dortmund amateur team as they won the league, and Achenbach marked himself out to be a top performer. He was bought by VfB Lübeck for €30,000 in 2003–04, where he proved to be a useful player and was part of the team, but the team was relegated at the end of the season. Once again Achenbach would be loaned, to 1. FC Köln, for the 2004–05 season, where he played in both the first team and in the amateur team in the Northern Regional League.

After a period of switching clubs, Achenbach finished up in SpVgg Greuther Fürth and has since signed a contract keeping him at the club until season 2007–08. In the 2009–10 season at 2. Bundesliga side Alemannia Aachen, Achenbach was attracting attention from clubs worldwide thanks to his prestigious skill, versatility and jinking runs.

References

External links
 
 
 

1982 births
Living people
People from Witten
Sportspeople from Arnsberg (region)
Association football defenders
German footballers
Germany B international footballers
Germany under-21 international footballers
Borussia Dortmund II players
VfB Lübeck players
1. FC Köln players
SpVgg Greuther Fürth players
Alemannia Aachen players
SV Sandhausen players
KFC Uerdingen 05 players
2. Bundesliga players
Regionalliga players
Footballers from North Rhine-Westphalia